Associazione Calcio Dilettantistica Rivoli is an Italian association football club located in Rivoli, Piedmont.

It in the season 2010–11, from Serie D group A relegated, in the play-out, to Eccellenza Piedmont and Aosta Valley, where it plays in the current season.

Its colors are yellow and blue.

External links

Football clubs in Piedmont and Aosta Valley
Association football clubs established in 1925
1925 establishments in Italy